The 1895 United Kingdom general election was held from 13 July to 7 August 1895. 

William Gladstone had retired as Prime Minister the previous year, and Queen Victoria, disregarding Gladstone's advice to name Lord Spencer as his successor, appointed the Earl of Rosebery as the new Prime Minister. Rosebery's government found itself largely in a state of paralysis due to a power struggle between him and William Harcourt, the Liberal leader in the Commons. The situation came to a head on 21 June, when Parliament voted to dismiss Secretary of State for War Henry Campbell-Bannerman; Rosebery, realising that the government would likely not survive a motion of no confidence were one to be brought, promptly resigned as Prime Minister. Conservative leader Lord Salisbury was subsequently re-appointed for a third spell as Prime Minister, and promptly called a new election.

The election was won by the Conservatives, who continued their alliance with the Liberal Unionist Party and won a large majority. The Liberals, in contrast, went down to what at the time was their worst result since the party's foundation, winning just 177 seats. The Irish Parliamentary Party was split at this time; most of its MPs (the "Anti-Parnellites") followed John Dillon, while a rump (the "Parnellites") followed John Redmond. The Independent Labour Party, having only previously existed as a loose grouping of left-wing politicians, formally organized into a party led by Keir Hardie in 1893 and contested their first election. They earned relatively little attention at this election, winning slightly less than one percent of the popular vote and no seats, but would enjoy greater success five years later, when they ran under the banner of the Labour Representation Committee.

Results

|}

Voting summary

Seats summary

See also
List of MPs elected in the 1895 United Kingdom general election
Parliamentary franchise in the United Kingdom 1885–1918
1895 United Kingdom general election in Ireland

Notes

References

External links
Spartacus: Political Parties and Election Results
United Kingdom election results—summary results 1885–1979 

 
1895 elections in the United Kingdom
1895
General election
July 1895 events
August 1895 events
1895 elections in Ireland